Barbara Otte-Kinast (born 18 September 1964 in Ehmen) is a German politician of the Christian Democratic Union (CDU) in Lower Saxony.

Political career
Since 22 November 2017 Otte-Kinast has been serving as State Minister of Food, Agriculture, Consumer Protection and State Development in the cabinet of Minister-President Stephan Weil. In this capacity, she is one of the state's representatives at the Bundesrat, where she serves on the Committee on Agricul­tur­al Pol­i­cy and Con­sumer Pro­tec­tion.

During her time in office, Otte-Kinast oversaw the government’s response to a 2022 outbreak of the African swine fever virus in the state, which is Germany's most important pig rearing region. 

Otte-Kinast was nominated by her party as delegate to the Federal Convention for the purpose of electing the President of Germany in 2022.

References 

 
 
 

Living people
1964 births
Christian Democratic Union of Germany politicians
People from Wolfsburg
21st-century German politicians
Ministers of the Lower Saxony State Government